Jarayotar may refer to:

Jarayotar, Janakpur
Jarayotar, Kosi